Wykeham is a hamlet in North Yorkshire, England. It is situated just off the A169 road and is north-east of Malton.

References

Hamlets in North Yorkshire
Malton, North Yorkshire